Zella Lehr  (born March 14, 1951) is an American singer and entertainer. She had hit records on RCA Records and Columbia Records, most notably her cover of Dolly Parton's "Two Doors Down (which charted for Lehr in late 1977, before Parton herself had released the song as a single). She had been on the Billboard Hot Country Singles chart for 18 weeks and in 1980 was nominated by the Academy of Country Music and Cashbox Magazine for the 'Most Promising Female Vocalist' award.

Zella has spent her life on stage, making her debut at the age of seven along with her parents and two brothers performing as 'The Lehr Family'. She made guest appearances on the Merv Griffin Show and The Tonight Show Starring Johnny Carson before becoming a regular on the CBS television show Hee Haw as the 'unicycle girl'. A TV Guide article of her exploits led to her first Las Vegas showroom engagement, which in turn resulted in appearances with Wayne Newton, Sammy Davis Jr., Glen Campbell, and the Statler Brothers. After relocating to Reno, Nevada she was named Northern Nevada's Entertainer of the Year for seven years in a row. Lehr went on to own and operate Zella Lehr's Dinner Theater from 2000–2004, and now has a premier entertainment production company and talent agency.

Discography

Singles

References

External links
 Hee Haw Official Site

1951 births
American women country singers
American country singer-songwriters
Living people
21st-century American women
Musicians from Burbank, California